Grzegorz Zajączkowski (born 25 June 1980) is a Polish sprinter who specializes in the 400 metres.

Zajączkowski was part of Poland's 4 × 400 metres relay at the 2003 World Indoor Championships, together with teammates Rafał Wieruszewski, Marcin Marciniszyn and Marek Plawgo. The team originally finished in 4th place, but received bronze medals after the 1st place USA team was later disqualified.

Personal bests
 100 metres – 10.58 s (2004)
 200 metres – 20.95 s (2004)
 400 metres – 45.93 s (2004)

References

External links
 

1980 births
Living people
Polish male sprinters
People from Przemyśl
Sportspeople from Podkarpackie Voivodeship
World Athletics Indoor Championships medalists
21st-century Polish people